Juan Carlos Pulido Valera  (born August 5, 1971) is a former relief pitcher in Major League Baseball who played for the Minnesota Twins in 1994 and between 2003 and 2004. He batted and threw left-handed.

Career
Signed at 18 in 1989 by Minnesota, the hard-throwing Pulido was a bright prospect in the Twins' system, but a 1995 arm injury ruined his chances as a starter. After spending one season with the Twins in 1994, he spent the next decade in the minor leagues, as well as with the Orix BlueWave, before spending two more seasons with the Twins in 2003 and 2004.

In a three-season career, Pulido posted a 3–8 record with 47 strikeouts and a 5.98 ERA in  innings.

He had a successful career in Venezuelan Professional Baseball League (Liga Venezolana de Beisbol Profesional), playing for Navegantes del Magallanes, Tigres de Aragua and Cardenales de Lara. Lifetime, he had a 68–51 record, with a 3.08 ERA, in 234 appearances. In 2007, he did not play in any Summer League, instead coaching for the Texas Rangers Single-A team in the minor leagues. He was released by Cardenales in Venezuela, and rehired by his original team, Magallanes.

See also
 List of Major League Baseball players from Venezuela

External links

Simply-Baseball-Notebook.com: Carlos Pulido's Amazing Journey.

1971 births
Living people
Acereros de Monclova players
Cardenales de Lara players
Guerreros de Oaxaca players
Gulf Coast Twins players
Iowa Cubs players
Kenosha Twins players
Major League Baseball pitchers
Major League Baseball players from Venezuela
Mercuries Tigers players
Mexican League baseball pitchers
Minnesota Twins players
Navegantes del Magallanes players
Nippon Professional Baseball pitchers
Norfolk Tides players
Orix BlueWave players
Orlando Cubs players
Orlando Sun Rays players
Ottawa Lynx players
People from Caracas
Portland Beavers players
Rochester Red Wings players
Salt Lake Buzz players
Somerset Patriots players
Tiburones de La Guaira players
Tigres de Aragua players
Venezuelan expatriate baseball players in Canada
Venezuelan expatriate baseball players in Japan
Venezuelan expatriate baseball players in Mexico
Venezuelan expatriate baseball players in Taiwan
Venezuelan expatriate baseball players in the United States
Visalia Oaks players